Tor Uyghurs, also called Uyghurs of Tor, and officially recognized as Tor Tajiks (by the Chinese Government), are a Uyghur sub-group who are native to the Tor village in the Kashgar Prefecture in Xinjiang, China.

Name

Despite the name that China recognizes them as (Tor Tajiks), the Tor Uyghurs are Turkic and they are ethnic Uyghurs, who are not the same as the Tajiks (an Iranic people who speak the Tajik language). Officially, Tor Uyghurs are regarded as "Tajik", one of the 56 ethnic groups officially recognized by the government of China. The Chinese term 'Tajik' includes three distinct groups: Iranic Sarikolis, Iranic Wakhans, and the Turkic Tor Uyghurs.

Language
Their language is a Karluk variety that is intermediate between the Uyghur language and the Uzbek language.

Sarikoli, an Iranic language, however, shows some phonological similarities to Turkic languages such as Kazakh and Uyghur spoken in the nearby area, including general lexical, morphological and syntactical structures common to Turkic languages.

Culture 

Intermarriages between the Sarikoli and Wakhi groups is usually common, however, the Tor Uyghurs tend to take more pride in their identity and hardly ever intermarry with Sarikoli or Wakhi Tajiks.

References

Main Sources 
 Kim, D. (2017): Topics in the syntax of Sarikoli, Doctoral Thesis, Leiden University. (PDF1, PDF2)
 Arlund S., Pamela (2006): An acoustic, historical, and developmental analysis of Sarikol Tajik Diphthongs, University of Texas at Arlington. (PDF1, PDF2)

 
Turkic peoples of Asia
Islam in China
Muslim communities of China
Articles containing video clips
Ethnic groups in Xinjiang
Ethnic groups officially recognized by China
Shia communities